Andrew Thomas Philip Fox (born 15 January 1993) is an English professional footballer who currently plays for USL Championship club Orange County SC.

Fox played college soccer in the United States for St. Edward's University in Austin, Texas. After a short spell at Midland/Odessa Sockers, Fox moved back to England in July 2015, where he joined League One side Peterborough United on a free transfer. He joined National League side Kidderminster Harriers on loan in August 2015, less than one month later he returned to Peterborough. In June 2016, Fox signed for Stevenage in League Two. After being released, Fox spent a season in the Allsvenskan – Sweden's top tier with AFC Eskilstuna in August 2017. Having become a free agent, he signed for League Two side Grimsby Town until the end of season, having previously being on trial at the start of the season.

College career
Fox studied at St. Edward's University in Austin, Texas, where he played for their soccer team and finished having scored 36 goals in 64 appearances.

Club career

Midland/Odessa Sockers
Fox played for the Midland/Odessa Sockers for two months. In his nine matches with the Sockers, he tallied three goals and three assists in his role as a play-making midfielder. He then went back to England for a two-week trial with Peterborough in June 2015.

Peterborough United
On 20 June 2015, Fox was signed by League One side Peterborough United along with Irishman Kieran Sadlier and Ivorian Souleymane Coulibaly. His debut came on 24 October 2015 as a 67th minute substitution, on for Jermaine Anderson in a 4–0 win against Doncaster Rovers. He scored his first goal for the club on 16 April 2016 having only been on pitch two minutes in the 4–1 win at Colchester, a right footed shot from 8-yards to put them 2–0 up.

Fox was released by Peterborough at the end of the 2015–16 season after the expiry of his one-year contract.

Kidderminster Harriers (loan)
Fox joined Kidderminster on a month loan deal from Peterborough United on 18 August 2015. He started 6 games and returned to Peterborough a month later.

Stevenage
Fox joined League Two side Stevenage on a one-year deal in June 2016. After making 9 league appearances for Stevenage in the 2016–17 season he was released by the club on 12 May 2017.

AFC Eskilstuna
Fox joined Allsvenskan side AFC Eskilstuna for the remainder of the season in August 2017.

Grimsby Town
Fox had been a free agent after the season ended in Sweden, he joined EFL League Two side Grimsby Town on 9 March 2018 until the end of the season, he became Michael Jolley's first signing of his tenure. He had previously been on trial with the club under manager Russell Slade in July 2017. He was offered a new contract by Grimsby at the end of the 2017–18 season.
Fox achieved infamy on 5 January 2019 when he became the first player in English football to receive a red card following a video assistant referee decision.

At the end of his contract, Fox moved to Texas, USA to be with his wife, having left the club at the end of January 2019.

El Paso Locomotive
On 4 February 2019, Fox joined USL Championship side El Paso Locomotive ahead of their inaugural season. He made 90 appearances for the club over four seasons before departing following the lackluster 2022 season.

Orange County SC
Fox signed a multi-year contract with Orange County SC on 14 December 2022.

Career statistics

References

External links
Andrew Fox profile at the Grimsby Town F.C. website

1993 births
Living people
People from Huntingdon
St. Edward's University alumni
English expatriate sportspeople in the United States
Expatriate soccer players in the United States
English expatriate sportspeople in Sweden
English expatriate footballers
Expatriate footballers in Sweden
English footballers
National Premier Soccer League players
National League (English football) players
Allsvenskan players
English Football League players
Association football defenders
Midland-Odessa Sockers FC players
Peterborough United F.C. players
Kidderminster Harriers F.C. players
Stevenage F.C. players
AFC Eskilstuna players
Grimsby Town F.C. players
El Paso Locomotive FC players
Orange County SC players
USL Championship players
St. Edward's Hilltoppers
College men's soccer players in the United States